Christian Wilhelm von Dohm (11 December 1751 – 29 May 1820) was a German historian and political writer.

Biography
Dohm was born in Lemgo on 11 December 1751. He entered Prussian officialdom in 1779, first as archivist in Berlin. In 1781, Dohm published a two-volume work entitled Ueber die bürgerliche Verbesserung der Juden ("On the Civil Improvement of the Jews"), which argued for Jewish political equality on humanitarian grounds. It was widely praised by the Jewish communities in Berlin, Halberstadt, and Suriname. In 1786 he was ennobled (untitled nobility), gaining him the nobiliary particle von before his surname.

Dohm died on his  estate near Nordhausen on 29 May 1820.

References
 

1751 births
1820 deaths
People from the Principality of Lippe
18th-century German historians
German male non-fiction writers
People from Lemgo
German Freemasons
Members of the Bavarian Academy of Sciences
Ambassadors to Saxony
Geheimrat
Activists against antisemitism
Opposition to antisemitism in Germany